Archie Ogden (born 24 February 1994) is an English cricketer. He is a left-handed batsman and a left-arm medium-fast bowler. He made his first-class debut for Leeds/Bradford MCCU against Warwickshire on 31 March 2016.

References

External links

1994 births
Living people
English cricketers
Leeds/Bradford MCCU cricketers
Cricketers from Rotherham
Suffolk cricketers
English cricketers of the 21st century